The table below shows some of the  parameters of common superconductors. X:Y means material X doped with element Y, TC is the highest reported transition temperature in kelvins and HC is a critical magnetic field in tesla. "BCS" means whether or not the superconductivity is explained within the BCS theory.

List

Other types
 Fulleride superconductor  at 38K
 Polyhydrides hydrogen rich compounds stabilised under hundreds of gigapascals pressure, such as trihydrogen sulfide, at pressures above 90 GPa; 23 K at 100 GPa to 150 K at 200 GPa, or lanthanum decahydride, or carbonaceous sulfur hydride, or clathrate calcium hydride .

See also

Notes

References

External links
A review of 700 potential superconductors 

Superconductivity
Superconductors